Lenaa (born 18 March 1981) is an Indian actress and scriptwriter who appears predominantly in Malayalam cinema.

Career
She made her debut in Jayaraj's Sneham, which was followed by critically acclaimed Karunam. She had also established as a lead actress in the Malayalam television industry with serials like Omanathinkalpakshi, Ohari, Malayogam and Thadankalpalayam before focusing on her film career. She is also a television host and manages the YouTube Vlogging channel - Lena's Magazine. She has over 100 films to her credit in Malayalam cinema along with films in English, Tamil, Telugu and Hindi languages.

Some of her noted performance were in the critically acclaimed Traffic (2011) after which she acted in films such in Snehaveedu, Ee Adutha Kaalathu, Spirit, Left Right Left and Ennu Ninte Moideen in supporting roles. Lenaa will star alongside Adil Hussain (Parched, Hotel Salvation) in a British-Indian feature titled Footprints On Water, to be directed by Nathalia Syam.

Personal life

Lenaa attended the Seventh Day Adventist Higher Secondary School in Thrissur, and Hari Sri Vidya Nidhi School, also in Thrissur. Lenaa is a post-graduate in Clinical psychology, and has worked as a clinical psychologist in Mumbai, before she quit her job to enter full-time acting.

Lenaa has recently revealed her plans for a directorial debut as she confirmed completing the first draft of the project which is in pipeline.

Filmography

Television serials

Independent projects and endorsements

As dubbing artist
2022 - K.G.F: Chapter 2 - voiceover for Raveena Tandon (Malayalam version)

As host
 Your Choice (Asianet)
 Amul Sangeetha Mahayudham (Surya TV)
 Vivel Big Break (Surya TV)
 Lena's Magazine (YouTube)

Album
 Pranayam
 Pranayathin Ormakkayi
 Amma Manasam

Endorsements
 Grandma's
 MJ Foods
 Indulekha Bringa Hair Oil
 Maruthua Panja Jeerakam

Awards

References

External links

 

Living people
Actresses from Thrissur
20th-century Indian actresses
21st-century Indian actresses
Indian television actresses
Indian film actresses
Actresses in Malayalam cinema
Actresses in Malayalam television
Hari Sri Vidya Nidhi School alumni
Kerala State Television Award winners
Kerala State Film Award winners
1981 births
Actresses in Telugu cinema
Actresses in Hindi cinema
Actresses in Tamil cinema